Agios Ioannis, also known as Aghios Ioannis on signage, is a station on Athens Metro Line 2.

History
The station was part of the original Athens Metro plan that was approved in 1991. It opened on 15 November 2000 along with the Syntagma-Dafni extension, 10 months after the first section of the system opened.

Entrances
The station can be reached by two entrances, both on Agios Ioannis Square. The one is located near Kasomouli street and the other near Pytheou street. There is also an elevator located on the square.

Gallery

References

Athens Metro stations
Railway stations opened in 2000
2000 establishments in Greece